Leshorn Whitehead (born June 15, 1972), better known by his stage name Chuck Fenda, is a Jamaican American reggae musician and deejay born in Brooklyn, New York City. Raised in Jamaica, Fenda is also known as  "The Living Fire", "Poor People Defender" and "Chuck Fender".  He has toured in both the United States and Jamaica. His songs include "I Swear", "Poor People Cry" and "Better Days", all of which are from his album Better Days. His song "All About da Weed" was featured in the soundtrack for the video game Grand Theft Auto IV.

His Lloyd "John John "James, Jr.-produced fifth album Jah Element was released September 10, 2013, on John John Records.

Discography
Studio albums
 Better Days (2005), Fifth Element
 The Living Fire (2007), Greensleeves – with song "Child of the Universe" featuring Tanya Stephens.
 Fulfillment (2009), VP
 Live in San Francisco (2009), 2B1
 Jah Element (2013), John John Records

Compilation appearances
 Grand Theft Auto IV soundtrack (2008)

References

External links
The Jamaica Star, May 18, 2006 – Fender Won't Bow, by Teino Evans, Staff Reporter
BigUpRadio – Chuck Fender
VPRecords.com Morgan Heritage Tour Japan

American reggae musicians
Jamaican reggae musicians
1972 births
Living people
Musicians from Brooklyn
American people of Jamaican descent